A terricolous lichen is a lichen that grows on the soil as a substrate. An example is some members of the genus Peltigera.

References 

Lichenology